McKay is a surname. It may also refer to:


Places
 McKay Cliffs, part of the Geologists mountain range, Ross Dependency, Antarctica
 Mount McKay (Australia), Victoria, Australia
 Mount McKay, Ontario, Canada
 McKay Lake (Pic River), Ontario
 McKay Township, Ontario
 McKay Bay, Florida, United States
 McKay Lake (Minnesota), United States
 McKay, Oregon, United States, an unincorporated community
 McKay Park, Bend, Oregon
 McKay Reservoir, Oregon
 McKay Ridge, Washington, United States

People and fictional characters
 McKay (given name)

Buildings in the United States
 The McKay, an apartment building in Indianapolis, Indiana
 McKay Events Center, original name of the UCCU Center, a multi-purpose arena on the campus of Utah Valley University
 McKay Tower, an office building in Grand Rapids, Michigan

See also
 MacKay (disambiguation)